Noel Taylor is a former New Zealand long-distance runner.

At the 1950 British Empire Games he won the bronze medal in the men's six miles event; and also competed in the three miles event.

External links
 

New Zealand male long-distance runners
Commonwealth Games bronze medallists for New Zealand
Athletes (track and field) at the 1950 British Empire Games
Commonwealth Games medallists in athletics
Living people
Year of birth missing (living people)
Medallists at the 1950 British Empire Games